Rodrigo José Pereira (born 11 January 1988), known as Rodrigo Fuska, is a Brazilian footballer who currently plays for São José.

Biography
Fuska started his career at Grêmio Barueri, which he played 3 times in Campeonato Brasileiro Série B 2007. In August 2008 he was loaned to Boavista F.C. of Portuguese Liga de Honra, along with teammate Michel and Renato Santos.

In September 2009, he joined Botafogo-RJ of Campeonato Brasileiro Série A, but did not play.

In February 2010, he returned to Barueri, but for SC Barueri (ex-Campinas) as Grêmio Barueri was relocated to Presidente Prudente. He signed a contract until the end of Campeonato Paulista Série A3.

On 10 January 2011, he joined the Brazilian Série A side Ceará.

References

External links
 
 Profile at Portuguese Liga 
 Profile at CBF 

Brazilian footballers
Brazilian expatriate footballers
Grêmio Barueri Futebol players
Boavista F.C. players
Botafogo de Futebol e Regatas players
Association football midfielders
Expatriate footballers in Portugal
Brazilian expatriate sportspeople in Portugal
Footballers from São Paulo
1988 births
Living people
Sport Club Barueri players